This is a list of airports in Japan, grouped by classification and sorted by location. As of February 2012, the country has a total of 98 airports, of which 28 are operated by the central government and 67 by local governments.

Airport classifications
In Japan, airports serving civil aviation routes are governed by the Aeronautical Law for safety purposes, by the Noise Prevention Law for noise prevention purposes and by the Airport Act for economic development purposes. The latter law groups such airports into four legal classifications:

 Hub/First Class airports (拠点空港) serve a hub role in domestic or international transportation. They are subdivided into privately managed airports (the three largest international airports), national airports (run by the central government) and special regional airports (hubs run by prefectural or municipal governments).
 Regional/Second Class airports (地方管理空港) are other prefectural/municipal airports that the central government deems important to national aviation.
 Joint-use/Third Class airports (共用空港) are those shared between civil aviation and the Japan Self-Defense Forces.
 Other airports (その他の空港) fall outside the above categories.

Some airports in Japan do not fall under the scope of the Japanese airport statutes. These include the three major U.S. military air bases in Japan (Kadena Air Base, MCAS Iwakuni and Yokota Air Base) and certain smaller aerodromes for firefighting, corporate or other special purposes. In 2001, the Ministry of Agriculture, Forestry and Fisheries, which receives 20% of the public-works construction budget, commenced a scheme to build airfields predominantly for airlifting vegetables. Kasaoka Airfield was one of nine airfields constructed; however it was later determined that flying vegetables to Okayama from Kasaoka took just as long due to loading and unloading, and cost approximately six times as much as road transport.

Airports

Heliports

See also

 List of the busiest airports in Japan
 Japan Air Self-Defense Force (JASDF)
 Japan Ground Self-Defense Force (JGSDF)
 Japan Maritime Self-Defense Force (JMSDF)
 Transport in Japan
 List of airports by ICAO code: R#RJ RO – Japan
 Wikipedia:WikiProject Aviation/Airline destination lists: Asia#Japan

References

 Civil Aviation Bureau: Airports in Japan (map with English text)
 
  - includes IATA codes
 Great Circle Mapper: Airports in Japan - IATA and ICAO codes, coordinates
 World Aero Data: Airports in Japan - ICAO codes, coordinates

Footnotes

Japan
 
Airports
Airports
Japan Self-Defense Forces
Japan